Bukoba is a city with a population of 128,796 (2012 census), situated in the north west of Tanzania on the south western shores of Lake Victoria. It is the capital of the Kagera region, and the administrative seat for Bukoba Urban District. 

The city is served by Bukoba Airport and regular ferry connections to and from Mwanza, as well as roads to Uganda's Rakai District for cross-border commuters. Plans are underway for a standard gauge railway  to Uganda.

History

Bukoba City 

Situated on the south western shores of Lake Victoria, Bukoba lies only 1 degree south of the Equator.

Bukoba is situated at the South Western shores of Lake Victoria in the north western region of Tanzania. The regional capital and Kagera's biggest town is the gateway to the region.

Ports
Bukoba is currently Tanzania's second largest port on Lake Victoria after Mwanza.

Utility

Bukoba is served by the National Electric Utility Company TANESCO.

Economy
Kagera's Regional Commissioner Col. Fabian Massawe resides and has his head office in The Bukoba Central Business District.

The city is flat and compact, forming a bowl as it is surrounded by hills. The town has a bus stand, a big airport and a port with a ferry that used to travel from Bukoba via Kemondo bay port to Mwanza on Monday, Wednesday and Friday nights, but was suspended in 2014 when the ferry broke down irreparably.

Airport

Bukoba Airport
The Airport is located south east of the city. The address on Sokoine Road.

Auric Air flies three times a day to Mwanza. In 2010 the airport was being extended as more flights were expected in line with capacity growth milestones of The Air Terminal reviewed after published reports every quarter of the year. Air Tanzania (ATCL) also have scheduled flights to Bukoba throughout the week with connecting flights through Mwanza to Dar es Salaam

Transport

Bus
Bus Station leaves for Kampala at 7 am every day (about 6 hours) and from Kampala for Bukoba at 11 am every day. It boasts a white sandy beach, a large market, a port tennis courts and a swimming pool. It has three banks, two of which take VISA cards in the ATM.

Bukoba Town itself has the status of a municipal Council. It has a municipal Director and other local government officials like other district councils in the region.

Sports
Bukoba is represented in the Tanzanian Premier League by football club Kagera Sugar.  It is the home to several charities - including SHARE in Africa and Jambo Bukoba. Both are focused on the educational sector.

The Kaitaba Stadium is also found in south east of Bukoba on Jamhuri Road.

Climate 
Bukoba has a tropical monsoon climate (Köppen Am) although it is milder than most climates with that classification due to altitude. It can sometimes get cool especially in the evenings during the two rainy seasons, but never as cold as the winter season in Europe.

Sister cities 
 Nykøbing Mors

Gallery

References

External links

 Official Bukoba webguide

 
Populated places in Kagera Region
Regional capitals in Tanzania
Populated places on Lake Victoria
Cities in the Great Rift Valley